Andrew B. McKenzie (January 4, 1887 – December 17, 1951) was an American physician. He was the first African American to practice medicine in Tuscaloosa, Alabama.

Born in Tallassee, Alabama, Andrew was the oldest of five children. He studied at the Tuskegee Institute, St. Augustine's College in Raleigh, and earned his medical degree in 1912 at the Leonard Medical School of Shaw University in Raleigh.

In honor of his memory, the McKenzie Courts in West End, Tuscaloosa, was named after him. He is buried next to Stillman College at West Highland Cemetery.

References

1887 births
1951 deaths
People from Tuscaloosa, Alabama
African-American physicians
Physicians from Alabama
20th-century African-American people